Giovanni Zoboli (22 July 1821 - 1884) was an Italian composer.

He concluded his studies in 1843, deciding initially to pursue a career in church music; in 1850 he was named to the faculty of his alma mater, teaching counterpoint and composition. During his career he also directed the municipal band of Ariano Irpino. As a composer Zoboli produced symphonic and instrumental works as well as operas. He died in the city of his birth. All of his operas were premiered at the Teatro Nuovo in Naples.

Operas
Il figlio di papà (1856)
La villeggiatura (1857)
Cesare e Cleopatra (1858)
Un evento inaspettato (1861)
Il bacio (1864)
Adina (1866)
Amelia (c.1870)
Salvator Rosa (c.1870)
I tre nipoti (c.1870)
Source:

References

1821 births
1884 deaths
Italian classical composers
Italian male classical composers
Italian opera composers
Male opera composers
19th-century Italian composers
19th-century classical composers
19th-century Italian male musicians
Musicians from Naples